No. 680 Squadron RAF was a photo-reconnaissance squadron of the Royal Air Force, active during the Second World War.

History
No. 680 Squadron RAF was formed in February 1943 from 'A' Flight of No. 2 Photographic Reconnaissance Unit (PRU), equipped with a variety of aircraft including Supermarine Spitfires, Hawker Hurricanes, Bristol Beaufighters and Lockheed Electras. It continued in the photographic reconnaissance role, operating in North Africa and the Mediterranean. 
In early 1944, the unit converted to Martin Baltimores and de Havilland Mosquitoes, deploying to Sicily and Sardinia later in the year.
After the end of the war, 680 Squadron flew surveying missions in the Middle East, before being disbanded by renumbering it to No. 13 Squadron RAF on 1 September 1946.

Noted squadron members
A well-known Australian actor, Charles "Bud" Tingwell, piloted Spitfires and Mosquitoes with the squadron.

Aircraft operated

Squadron bases

Commanding officers

References

Notes

Bibliography

External links
 Squadron histories at RAF Web
 History of 680 Squadron
 Movement and Equipment records

Military units and formations established in 1943
680 Squadron
Aircraft squadrons of the Royal Air Force in World War II
Military units and formations disestablished in 1946
Military units and formations in Mandatory Palestine in World War II
680